Environmental engineering is a professional engineering discipline related to environmental science. It encompasses broad scientific topics like chemistry, biology, ecology, geology, hydraulics, hydrology, microbiology, and mathematics to create solutions that will protect and also improve the health of living organisms and improve the quality of the environment. Environmental engineering is a sub-discipline of civil engineering and chemical engineering. While on the part of civil engineering, the Environmental Engineering is focused mainly on Sanitary Engineering.

Environmental engineering applies scientific and engineering principles to improve and maintain the environment to protect human health, protect nature's beneficial ecosystems, and improve environmental-related enhancement of the quality of human life.
Environmental engineers devise solutions for wastewater management, water and air pollution control, recycling, waste disposal, and public health.  They design municipal water supply and industrial wastewater treatment systems, and design plans to prevent waterborne diseases and improve sanitation in urban, rural and recreational areas. They evaluate hazardous-waste management systems to evaluate the severity of such hazards, advise on treatment and containment, and develop regulations to prevent mishaps. They implement environmental engineering law, as in assessing the environmental impact of proposed construction projects.

Environmental engineers study the effect of technological advances on the environment, addressing local and worldwide environmental issues such as acid rain, global warming, ozone depletion, water pollution and air pollution from automobile exhausts and industrial sources.

Most jurisdictions impose licensing and registration requirements for qualified environmental engineers.

Etymology 
The word environmental has its root in the late 14th-century French word environ (verb), meaning to encircle or to encompass. The word environment was used by Carlyle in 1827 to refer to the aggregate of conditions in which a person or thing lives. The meaning shifted again in 1956 when it was used in the ecological sense, where Ecology is the branch of science dealing with the relationship of living things to their environment.

The second part of the phrase environmental engineer originates from Latin roots and was used in the 14th century French as engignour, meaning a constructor of military engines such as trebuchets, harquebuses, longbows, cannons, catapults, ballistas, stirrups, armour as well as other deadly or bellicose contraptions. The word engineer was not used to reference public works until the 16th century; and it likely entered the popular vernacular as meaning a contriver of public works during John Smeaton's time.

History

Ancient civilizations 
Environmental engineering is a name for work that has been done since early civilizations, as people learned to modify and control the environmental conditions to meet needs. As people recognized that their health was related to the quality of their environment, they built systems to improve it. The ancient Indus Valley Civilization (3300 B.C.E. to 1300 B.C.E.) had advanced control over their water resources. The public work structures found at various sites in the area include wells, public baths, water storage tanks, a drinking water system, and a city-wide sewage collection system. They also had an early canal irrigation system enabling large-scale agriculture.

From 4000 to 2000 B.C.E., many civilizations had drainage systems and some had sanitation facilities, including the Mesopotamian Empire, Mohenjo-Daro, Egypt, Crete, and the Orkney Islands in Scotland. The Greeks also had aqueducts and sewer systems that used rain and wastewater to irrigate and fertilize fields.

The first aqueduct in Rome was constructed in 312 B.C.E., and from there, they continued to construct aqueducts for irrigation and safe urban water supply during droughts. They also built an underground sewer system as early as the 7th century B.C.E. that fed into the Tiber River, draining marshes to create farmland as well as removing sewage from the city.

Modern era 
Very little change was seen from the fall of Rome until the 19th century, where improvements saw increasing efforts focused on public health. Modern environmental engineering began in London in the mid-19th century when Joseph Bazalgette designed the first major sewerage system following the Great Stink. The city's sewer system conveyed raw sewage to the River Thames, which also supplied the majority of the city's drinking water, leading to an outbreak of cholera. The introduction of drinking water treatment and sewage treatment in industrialized countries reduced waterborne diseases from leading causes of death to rarities.

The field emerged as a separate academic discipline during the middle of the 20th century in response to widespread public concern about water and air pollution and other environmental degradation. As society and technology grew more complex, they increasingly produced unintended effects on the natural environment. One example is the widespread application of the pesticide DDT to control agricultural pests in the years following World War II. The story of DDT as vividly told in Rachel Carson's Silent Spring (1962) is considered to be the birth of the modern environmental movement, which led to the modern field of "environmental engineering."

Education

Many universities offer environmental engineering programs through either the department of civil engineering or chemical engineering and also including electronic projects to develop and balance the environmental 
conditions.  Environmental engineers in a civil engineering program often focus on hydrology, water resources management, bioremediation, and water and wastewater treatment plant design. Environmental engineers in a chemical engineering program tend to focus on environmental chemistry, advanced air and water treatment technologies, and separation processes. Some subdivisions of environmental engineering include natural resources engineering and agricultural engineering.

Courses for students fall into a few broad classes:

Mechanical engineering courses oriented towards designing machines and mechanical systems for environmental use such as water and wastewater treatment facilities, pumping stations, garbage segregation plants, and other mechanical facilities.
Environmental engineering or environmental systems courses oriented towards a civil engineering approach in which structures and the landscape are constructed to blend with or protect the environment.
Environmental chemistry, sustainable chemistry or environmental chemical engineering courses oriented towards understanding the effects of chemicals in the environment, including any mining processes, pollutants, and also biochemical processes.
Environmental technology courses oriented towards producing electronic or electrical graduates capable of developing devices and artifacts able to monitor, measure, model and control environmental impact, including monitoring and managing energy generation from renewable sources.

Curriculum 
The following topics make up a typical curriculum in environmental engineering:

Mass and Energy transfer
Environmental chemistry
Inorganic chemistry
Organic Chemistry
Nuclear Chemistry
Growth models
Resource consumption
Population growth
Economic growth
Risk assessment
Hazard identification
Dose-response Assessment
Exposure assessment
 Risk characterization
 Comparative risk analysis
Water pollution
Water resources and pollutants
Oxygen demand
 Pollutant transport
Water and waste water treatment
Air pollution
 Industry, transportation, commercial and residential emissions
 Criteria and toxic air pollutants
 Pollution modelling (e.g. Atmospheric dispersion modeling)
Pollution control
 Air pollution and meteorology
Global change
Greenhouse effect and global temperature
Carbon, nitrogen, and oxygen cycle
IPCC emissions scenarios
 Oceanic changes (ocean acidification, other effects of global warming on oceans) and changes in the stratosphere (see Physical impacts of climate change)
Solid waste management and resource recovery
Life cycle assessment
Source reduction
Collection and transfer operations
Recycling
Waste-to-energy conversion
Landfill

Mass Balance 
Consider a man made chemical that we wish to find the fate of in relation to time, position, some phase of matter, or flow of a liquid. We represent the measured change in concentration as a function of all the rates of change that effect that clump of chemical matter.

Meaning that for some control volume, the change in concentration versus change in linear independent time is equal to the sum of whatever changes are occurring in (+) and out(-) of that control volume. This is allowed for a few different reasons:

(1) Conservation of mass.(2) Representation as an ordinary differential equation.

(3) A solution exists.

Although differential equations can be intimidating, this formula for a change in the concentration for a control volume per time is very versatile even without calculus. Take for instance the common scenario of a tank containing a volume with a contaminant of a certain concentration. Given that there is a first order reaction -kC taking place and that the tank is in steady state the effluent concentration becomes an expression of the initial concentration, the reaction constant k, and the hydraulic retention time (HRT) which is equal to the quotient of the volume of the tank by the flow.

Applications

Water supply and treatment
Environmental engineers evaluate the water balance within a watershed and determine the available water supply, the water needed for various needs in that watershed, the seasonal cycles of water movement through the watershed and they develop systems to store, treat, and convey water for various uses.

Water is treated to achieve water quality objectives for the end uses. In the case of a potable water supply, water is treated to minimize the risk of infectious disease transmission, the risk of non-infectious illness, and to create a palatable water flavor. Water distribution systems are designed and built to provide adequate water pressure and flow rates to meet various end-user needs such as domestic use, fire suppression, and irrigation.

Wastewater treatment
There are numerous wastewater treatment technologies. A wastewater treatment train can consist of a primary clarifier system to remove solid and floating materials, a secondary treatment system consisting of an aeration basin followed by flocculation and sedimentation or an activated sludge system and a secondary clarifier, a tertiary biological nitrogen removal system, and a final disinfection process. The aeration basin/activated sludge system removes organic material by growing bacteria (activated sludge).  The secondary clarifier removes the activated sludge from the water. The tertiary system, although not always included due to costs, is becoming more prevalent to remove nitrogen and phosphorus and to disinfect the water before discharge to a surface water stream or ocean outfall.

Air pollution management

Scientists have developed air pollution dispersion models to evaluate the concentration of a pollutant at a receptor or the impact on overall air quality from vehicle exhausts and industrial flue gas stack emissions. To some extent, this field overlaps the desire to decrease carbon dioxide and other greenhouse gas emissions from combustion processes.

Environmental impact assessment and mitigation

Environmental engineers apply scientific and engineering principles to evaluate if there are likely to be any adverse impacts to water quality, air quality, habitat quality, flora and fauna, agricultural capacity, traffic, ecology, and noise. If impacts are expected, they then develop mitigation measures to limit or prevent such impacts. An example of a mitigation measure would be the creation of wetlands in a nearby location to mitigate the filling in of wetlands necessary for a road development if it is not possible to reroute the road.

In the United States, the practice of environmental assessment was formally initiated on January 1, 1970, the effective date of the National Environmental Policy Act (NEPA). Since that time, more than 100 developing and developed nations either have planned specific analogous laws or have adopted procedure used elsewhere. NEPA is applicable to all federal agencies in the United States.

Regulatory agencies

Environmental Protection Agency
The U.S. Environmental Protection Agency (EPA) is one of the many agencies that work with environmental engineers to solve key issues. An important component of EPA's mission is to protect and improve air, water, and overall environmental quality in order to avoid or mitigate the consequences of harmful effects.

See also

Associations

References

Further reading
Davis, M. L. and D. A. Cornwell, (2006) Introduction to environmental engineering (4th ed.)  McGraw-Hill 
 

 
Chemical engineering
Civil engineering
Environmental science
Engineering disciplines
Environmental terminology